Professional Association of Therapeutic Horsemanship International (PATH Intl.), formerly the North American Riding for the Handicapped Association (NARHA), is a non-profit organization based in Denver, Colorado, that promotes the benefits of therapeutic horseback riding and other equine-assisted activities and therapies for people with physical, emotional and learning disabilities. PATH Intl. serves people of all ages, backgrounds and walks of life. They serve people with both physical challenges as well as those with mental challenges . Some examples of challenges participants face are multiple sclerosis, down syndrome, post traumatic stress disorder, autism and traumatic brain injuries. PATH Intl. is a 501(c)(3) organization.
 
The PATH Intl. mission statement: "The Professional Association of Therapeutic Horsemanship International (PATH Intl.) promotes safety and optimal outcomes in equine-assisted activities and therapies for individuals with special needs."

With more than 860 member centers, a total of nearly 62,000 children and adults, including more than 4,000 veterans, find a sense of independence through involvement with horses. These member centers range from small, one-person programs to large operations with several riding instructors. In addition to horseback riding, a center may offer any number of equine-assisted activities and therapies such as driving, vaulting, trail riding, competition, hippotherapy, equine-facilitated psychotherapy, groundwork, and stable management. Through a wide variety of educational resources, the association helps individuals start and maintain successful programs. As of December 31, 2018, there are 873 centers that are members of PATH Intl. and 4,776 certified professionals working in these centers. On top of the certified professionals there are 61,642 volunteers working in the centers. There are over 7,943 different equines that are used as part of these programs. The centers and there staff and volunteers serve 68,929 adults and children with varying disabilities. Within the 68,929 participants in these programs 6,724 of them are veterans.

PATH Intl. provides opportunities for people with varying ability levels to challenge themselves physically and emotionally and to set goals to improve their quality of life via the horse. Training instructors and equine specialists to support and facilitate this process, accrediting centers to ensure safety, educating the public about the positive impact of the human/animal bond and setting standards for safe and effective equine-assisted activities and therapies are part of PATH Intl. long-range goals.

History 
PATH international was originally formed in 1969 as the North American Riding for the Handicapped Association (NARHA) to promote equine-assisted activities for individuals with disabilities. The organization was created because a group of individuals realized that there should be some type of organization to help get information about therapeutic horseback riding out to the public. The name was changed in July 2011 to better reflect the mission of and the people served by PATH Intl.

When it was first created the NARHA had two main goals, accrediting centers and certifying instructors. The founding members of the NARHA wanted to insure that equine assisted activity centers were being run properly and helping its participants gain benefits from the activities. Accrediting center and certifying instructors are still the core goals in the organization today.

PATH programs 
Besides horseback riding lessons, many of the PATH centers also offer equine assisted therapies such as driving, vaulting, competitions, hippotherapy, ground work and stable management. In addition to these programs PATH Intl. has a program called PATH International Equine Services for Heroes, which is designed to help war veterans and military personnel. The program utilizes a number of equine assisted therapies to help military members after they have returned home. PATH Intl. has also partnered with the Wounded Warrior Project to help provide scholarships to wounded service members so that they can participate in equine assisted activities at PATH Intl. accredited centers.

PATH Intl. benefits

Center accreditation 
Center accreditation programs ensure high quality and safe provision of equine assisted activities offered by PATH centers across the U.S. and Canada. Just as other professions use accreditation and licensing systems to improve the well-being of their industries, professionals in the field of equine assisted activities have a distinction of their own through the Premier Accredited Center Program. The Premier Accredited Center (PAC) Program, give centers the chance to demonstrate their excellence in providing quality equine assisted activities.

This voluntary process recognizes PATH Intl. centers that have met established industry standards. The accreditation process is a peer review system in which trained volunteer site visitors inspect and review centers in accordance with PATH standards. A center that meets the accreditation requirements based on the administrative, facility, program and applicable special interest standards becomes a Premier Accredited Center (PAC) for a period of five years.

Instructor certification/education 
PATH Intl. provides certification for a number of equine assisted therapies including riding, driving and vaulting as well as for equine specialists in mental health and learning. There are three levels of certification that riding instructors may achieve which are, Registered, Advanced and Master. Instructors may apply for any level of certification that they feel they qualified to achieve, as long as the meet the criteria for that level. Instructors may apply for any level of certification that they feel they are qualified to achieve, as long as the application criteria for that level are met. The criteria set for each level determines on much knowledge the instructor needs to have on Horsemanship, Disabilities, Equine Management, Instruction and Teaching Methodology. Instructor evaluations, regardless of level, are based on this criteria. Instructors must also complete a written  and practical exam as well attending workshops to achieve their accreditation. Instructors who teach at PATH Intl. Member Centers must be certified by PATH Intl. in order to work with program participants.

PATH Intl. also supports regional conferences for continuing education and hosts a national conference each year.

PATH Intl. Strides 
Four times a year PATH Intl. sends a copy of PATH Intl. Strides to its members. PATH Intl. Strides is a journal that focuses on the impact of PATH Intl. on its members. It includes rider profiles, how-to articles, editorials and instructional columns that help to get information about equine assisted activities out and explain some of the finer aspects of them to not only PATH Intl. members but the public as well. Each seasonal edition has its own theme. The publication is available in both an electronic format as well as a print format. The current issues of the publication are only available to PATH Intl. members, however non-members can view older editions of the publication through the PATH Intl. website.

See also
Equestrianism
National Sports Center for the Disabled

References

External links
PATH International

Equestrian organizations
Equine therapies
Parasports organizations in the United States
Organizations based in Denver
Organizations established in 1969
Non-profit organizations based in Colorado
501(c)(3) organizations